Glory & Honor is a 1998 American docudrama television film directed by Kevin Hooks and written by Jeff Lewis and Susan Rhinehart, from a story by Robert Caputo. The film is based on the true story of Robert Peary (Henry Czerny) and Matthew Henson's (Delroy Lindo) 1909 journey to the Geographic North Pole, and their nearly 20-year history of exploring the Arctic together. It aired on TNT on March 1, 1998.

Cast
 Delroy Lindo as Matthew Henson
 Henry Czerny as Robert Peary
 Bronwen Booth as Josephine Diebitsch Peary
 Kim Staunton as Lucy Ross Henson
 David Ferry as John Verhoeff
 Richard Fitzpatrick as Dr. Draper
 John Novak as Langdon Gibson

Production
Filming took place on Baffin Island and in Montreal, Canada.

Awards

References

External links
 
 

1998 television films
1998 films
1998 drama films
1990s adventure drama films
Adventure television films
American films based on actual events
American adventure drama films
American docudrama films
Drama films based on actual events
American drama television films
Films directed by Kevin Hooks
Films scored by Bruce Broughton
Films set in 1909
Films set in the Arctic
Films shot in Montreal
Films shot in Nunavut
Television films based on actual events
TNT Network original films
1990s English-language films
1990s American films